The Belgium women's national artistic gymnastics team represents Belgium in FIG international competitions.

History
Belgium has participated in the Olympic Games women's team competition thrice: in 1948, 2016, and 2020.  At the 2020 Olympic Games Nina Derwael became Belgium's first Olympic medalist in women's artistic gymnastics, winning gold on the uneven bars.

Current senior roster

Team competition results

Olympic Games
 1948 — 11th place
Albertine Van Roy-Moens, Denise Parmentier, Yvonne Van Bets, Jenny Schumacher, Caroline Verbraecken-De Loose, Thérèse De Grijze, Anna Jordaens, Julienne Boudewijns
 2016 – 12th place
Nina Derwael, Rune Hermans, Gaëlle Mys, Laura Waem, Senna Deriks
 2020 – 8th place
Maellyse Brassart, Nina Derwael, Lisa Vaelen, Jutta Verkest

Most decorated gymnasts
This list includes all Belgian female artistic gymnasts who have won a medal at the Olympic Games or the World Artistic Gymnastics Championships.

References

Gymnastics in Belgium
National women's artistic gymnastics teams
Women's national sports teams of Belgium